Kwato may be,

Kwato Island, New Guinea
Kwato language, Papua New Guinea (but not on Kwato Island)

See also
Kawato (disambiguation)